Big Mouth is an American adult animated coming-of-age sitcom created by Andrew Goldberg, Nick Kroll, Mark Levin, and Jennifer Flackett for Netflix. The series centers on teens based on Kroll and Goldberg's upbringing in suburban New York, with Kroll voicing his fictional younger self. Big Mouth explores puberty while  "embrac[ing] a frankness about the human body and sex." The series premiered on Netflix on September 29, 2017.

 In July 2019, Netflix renewed the series through to a sixth season. In April 2022, Netflix gave a seventh season order ahead of its sixth season, with the latter having premiered on October 28, 2022.

Series overview

Episodes

Season 1 (2017)

Season 2 (2018)

Season 3 (2019)

Season 4 (2020)

Season 5 (2021)

Season 6 (2022)

References

Big Mouth
Big Mouth
Big Mouth (TV series)